Vinod Sharma (born 9 April 1946) is an Indian former cricketer. He played in 40 first-class matches between 1964 and 1979. He is now an umpire, and stood in a match in the opening round of the 2019–20 Ranji Trophy.

References

External links
 

1946 births
Living people
Indian cricketers
Indian cricket umpires
Northern Punjab cricketers
Punjab, India cricketers
Place of birth missing (living people)